In filmmaking and video production, footage is raw, unedited material as originally filmed by a movie camera or recorded by a (often special) video camera, which typically must be edited to create a motion picture, video clip, television show or similar completed work.

Footage may also refer to sequences used in film and video editing, such as special effects and archive material (for special cases of this, see stock footage and B roll). 

Since the term originates in film, footage is only used for recorded images, such as film stock, videotapes or digitized clips – on live television, the signals from video cameras are instead called sources.

History

The origin of the term "footage" comes from early 35 mm silent film, which is traditionally measured in feet and frames; the fact that film was measured by length in cutting rooms, and that there are 16 frames (4-perf film format) in a foot of 35 mm film which roughly represented 1 second of screen time (frame rate) in some early silent films, made footage a natural unit of measure for film. The term then became used figuratively to describe moving image material of any kind.

Types of footage

Film footage 
Sometimes film projects will also sell or trade footage, usually second unit material not used in the final cut. For example, the end of the non-director's cut version of Blade Runner used landscape views that were originally shot for The Shining before the script was modified after shooting had finished.

Television footage 

Television footage, especially news footage, is often traded between television networks, but good footage usually commands a high price. The actual sum depends on duration, age, size of intended audience, duration of licensing and other factors.

Amateur video footage 
Amateur footage is the low-budget hobbyist art of film practised for passion and enjoyment and not for business purposes. Amateur video footage of current events, for instance from camcorders, smart phones or closed-circuit television, can also often fetch a high price on the market – scenes shot inside the World Trade Center during the September 11, 2001 attacks were reportedly sold for US$45,000.

Stock footage 
Stock footage is film or video footage that can be used again in other films. Stock footage is beneficial to filmmakers as it saves shooting new material. A single piece of stock footage is called a "stock shot" or a "library shot". Stock footage may have appeared in previous productions but may also be outtakes or footage shot for previous productions and not used. Examples of stock footage that might be utilized are moving images of cities and landmarks, wildlife in their natural environments, and historical footage. Suppliers of stock footage may be either rights managed or royalty-free. Many websites offer direct downloads of clips in various formats.

Footage brokers
A footage broker is an agent who deals in footage by promoting it to footage purchasers or producers, while taking a profit in the sales transaction.

See also

 Film gauge
 Found footage (disambiguation)

References

External links

Running time calculator according to gauge, length and frame rate of the film

Film production
Home video supplements
Film and video terminology
Television terminology